Henry Wilson Temple (March 31, 1864 – January 11, 1955) was a Progressive and a Republican member of the U.S. House of Representatives from Pennsylvania.

Temple was born in Belle Center, Ohio. He graduated from Geneva College in Beaver Falls, Pennsylvania, in 1883, and from the Reformed Presbyterian Theological Seminary in Allegheny, Pennsylvania, in 1887. Before his ordination to the ministry, he worked at Reformed Presbyterian congregations in and around Mankato, Kansas. After his ordination, he served as the pastor of churches in Jefferson County, Leechburg, and Washington, Pennsylvania. He worked as professor of political science at Washington and Jefferson College in Washington, Pennsylvania, from 1898 to 1913.

Temple was elected as a Progressive to the Sixty-third Congress. He was an unsuccessful candidate for reelection to succeed himself in 1914. However, he was soon after elected to the seat as a Republican in the special election to the Sixty-fourth Congress to fill the vacancy caused by the death of Representative-elect William Brown (who had defeated him in the 1914 general election). He was reelected to the Sixty-fifth and to the seven succeeding Congresses. He was an unsuccessful candidate for reelection in 1932. He worked as professor of international relations in Washington and Jefferson College from 1933 until his retirement in 1947. He died in Washington, Pennsylvania, and is buried in Washington Cemetery.

Sources
 
 
 The Political Graveyard
 His biographical sketch in an 1888 church history, page 704

External links
 

1864 births
1955 deaths
People from Logan County, Ohio
Presbyterians from Ohio
American Presbyterian ministers
Progressive Party (1912) members of the United States House of Representatives from Pennsylvania
Republican Party members of the United States House of Representatives from Pennsylvania
People from Mankato, Kansas
Geneva College alumni
Washington & Jefferson College faculty
Burials in Pennsylvania